Farnworth and Kearsley First is a local political party to represent the views of the towns of Farnworth and Kearsley in the Metropolitan Borough of Bolton, Greater Manchester, England. It currently has five elected councillors.

History
The party received confirmation of its official party status from the Electoral Commission on 13 September 2017. The party won its first seat to Bolton Council by winning a by-election on 8 March 2018. Two months later, the party won two more seats in the 2018 Bolton Council election. In the 2019 Bolton Council election, the party won two further seats.

After the 2019 local election, the incumbent Labour elected 24 elected councillors, losing their majority on the council that they had maintained since 2011, and the leadership that they had maintained since 2006.

Farnworth and Kearsley First agreed with the six Liberal Democrats councillors, three UKIP councillors and two Horwich & Blackrod First Independents councillors, to provide a confidence and supply agreement with the Conservative Party who have 20 elected councillors.

References

External links
 
 

Locally based political parties in England
Politics of the Metropolitan Borough of Bolton